"I've Got a Life" is a song released by the British pop music duo Eurythmics. It was released as a single in 2005, in order to promote their second greatest hits compilation, Ultimate Collection. It was written by band members Annie Lennox and David A. Stewart and produced by Stewart. It was the duo's final single to date, becoming their fourteenth UK Top 20 hit, and also topped the US Dance Chart.

Recording
The song was one of two newly recorded tracks included on Eurythmics' second greatest hits package Ultimate Collection, and the only one of the two released as a single (the other newly recorded track being the song "Was It Just Another Love Affair?"). The song is an electronic dance tune with uplifting lyrics of empowerment. Its music video featured Lennox and Stewart performing the song in front of many television screens showing scenes from videos spanning their Eurythmics career. Lennox also reprised her "Sweet Dreams (Are Made of This)" image by performing the song in a man's suit (her hair was not shaved and colored orange, however). The music video for the song is directed by Matthew Rolston.

Track listings

UK CD 1
 "I've Got a Life" – 4:08
 "Sweet Dreams (Are Made of This)" (Steve Angello Remix) – 5:31

UK CD 2
 "I've Got a Life" – 4:06
 "I've Got a Life" (Sander Kleinenberg's You're It Mix)  – 7:35
 "Sweet Dreams (Are Made of This)" (Remastered) – 4:06
Video "I've Got a Life"

Personnel
Written-by – Lennox, Stewart
Producer – Stewart
Engineer, Programmed By – Ned Douglas 
Mixed By – Scott Campbell 
Art Direction, Design [Graphic Design] – Laurence Stevens
Photography by [Sleeve] – Michael Segal

Chart information
"I've Got a Life" returned Eurythmics to the Top 40 in the UK Singles Chart for the twenty-fourth time, peaking at number 14. The song was released as a digital download in the United States, although dance remixes were issued on vinyl to nightclub DJs. The track spent three weeks at number 1 on the US Hot Dance Club Play chart at the end of 2005 and reached number 31 on the US Adult Contemporary chart.

Charts

Weekly charts

Year-end charts

See also
 List of Billboard Hot Dance Club Play number ones of 2005

References

2005 songs
2005 singles
Arista Records singles
Eurythmics songs
Music videos directed by Matthew Rolston
Songs written by David A. Stewart
Songs written by Annie Lennox
Song recordings produced by Dave Stewart (musician and producer)
Sony BMG singles